Christmas is the seventh album released by the Sons of the San Joaquin.  It marks the first independently produced and released Sons recording since 1991's Bound for the Rio Grande.  The songs are all Christmas standards.  There would not be an original Sons-related Christmas recording until member Lon Hannah's solo album featured a lone Christmas song called "Cowboy Christmas," which was a reworking by Sons associate Bill Thornbury of Percy Faith and Spencer Maxwell's "Christmas Is."

Track listing

Personnel

Sons of the San Joaquin

Jack Hannah
Joe Hannah
Lon Hannah

Additional personnel

Kip Lewis - drums
Darrell Devaurs - piano
John Lauffenburger - bass
Eddie Gordon - harmonica
Ray Appleton - harmonica
Mike Dana - acoustic guitar, Tacoma papoose, orchestral arrangements
Dennis Mack - acoustic guitar, Tacoma papoose, accordion
Lon Hannah - acoustic guitar, Tacoma papoose
Richard Chon - fiddle
FAT City Strings - strings
FAT City Brass - brass
Ron Catalano - clarinet

Production

Sons of the San Joaquin - executive producers
Jeff Hall - executive producer, producer, engineer
Lon Hannah - producer
Vince Warner - engineer
WagonMaster - photography
Ed. Kesterson - cover design

Notes

Songwriting credits are as printed on the CD insert.  In some cases, these credits may be incorrect.  For example, Martin Luther is listed as coauthor of "Away in a Manger."  According to the song's Wikipedia entry, this is a "fable." Please refer to each song's individual Wikipedia entry for more detailed information, including proper songwriting attribution.

External links
Official site

References 

Sons of the San Joaquin albums
1998 Christmas albums
Christmas albums by American artists
Country Christmas albums